Orlebar is an English surname.

It may refer to:
 Augustus Orlebar (1897–1943), Royal Air Force officer
 Christopher Orlebar (1945–2018), British Concorde pilot
 Diana Astry Orlebar (1671–1716), British diarist and compiler of recipes
 John Orlebar (1697–1765), British politician, MP for Bedford 1727–1734

English-language surnames